Fuladshahr District is a district (bakhsh) in Lenjan County, Isfahan Province, Iran.  The District has one city: Fuladshahr.

References 

Lenjan County
Districts of Isfahan Province